The second supplementary elections took place for the National Assembly and Legislative Yuan of the Republic of China (Taiwan) on 23 December 1972.

Background
Compared with the first supplementary election the number of eligible seats for the National Assembly had been increased from 15 to 53 and for the Legislative Yuan from 11 to 51. Of these, 36 seats for the Legislative Yuan represented Taiwan Province, Kinmen and Matsu, and the special municipality of Taipei and were to be elected directly. The remaining 15 seats for the Legislative Yuan represented overseas nationals and were chosen by the President.

Results
Turnout for the supplementary election of the National Assembly was 68.35% and 68.18% for the Legislative Yuan. Of the newly elected members to the National Assembly 43 belonged to the Kuomintang and 10 were independent. Of the 36 elected delegates to the Legislative Yuan 30 belonged to the Kuomintang, 5 were independent and 1 belonged to the Chinese Youth Party. All representatives chosen were born Taiwanese except for 10 (5 in each of the legislative bodies) who were from the Mainland.

Legislative Yuan

By constituency

National Assembly

References

Further reading
Copper, John F. and George P. Chen (1984), Taiwan’s Elections. Political Development and Democratization in the Republic of China, [Baltimore, Md.], Occasional Papers/Reprints Series in Contemporary Asian Studies, no. 5-1984 (64), 

Taiwan
1972 elections in Taiwan
Legislative elections in Taiwan
Election and referendum articles with incomplete results